The discography of Italian singer Noemi is composed of six studio albums, a live album, an extended play and 23 singles as a lead artist.

Albums

Studio albums

Live albums

Extended plays

Singles

As lead artist

Featured singles

Other charted songs

Promotional singles

Other appearances

Music videos

Guest appearance
 2006 – "Dimmi come passi le notti" by Pier Cortese (with her sister Arianna)

References

Discographies of Italian artists